Muhammad Younis (born 4 November 1948) is a Pakistani former middle distance runner who competed in the 1972 Summer Olympics and in the 1976 Summer Olympics.

References

1948 births
Living people
Pakistani male middle-distance runners
Olympic athletes of Pakistan
Athletes (track and field) at the 1972 Summer Olympics
Athletes (track and field) at the 1976 Summer Olympics
Asian Games gold medalists for Pakistan
Asian Games silver medalists for Pakistan
Asian Games medalists in athletics (track and field)
Athletes (track and field) at the 1970 Asian Games
Athletes (track and field) at the 1974 Asian Games
Athletes (track and field) at the 1978 Asian Games
Medalists at the 1970 Asian Games
Medalists at the 1974 Asian Games
Medalists at the 1978 Asian Games
Commonwealth Games competitors for Pakistan
Athletes (track and field) at the 1970 British Commonwealth Games
20th-century Pakistani people